Greatest Hits (not to be confused with the 2002 compilation of the same name) is a CD/DVD compilation album by the band Blondie released in the UK on November 8, 2005 and internationally on March 6, 2006. It peaked at number 48 on the UK Albums Chart and charted for 7 weeks. This was the first Blondie hits package to combine the CD and DVD formats.

Overview 
The CD contains the band's greatest hits including their comeback hit "Maria", a UK #1 in 1999, as well as tracks from their latest studio album The Curse of Blondie, a new remix of "In The Flesh" and a mashup of "Rapture" and The Doors' "Riders on the Storm" entitled "Rapture Riders", which was a top ten hit on the U.S. Hot Dance Club Play chart in 2005. The DVD includes videos of seventeen of the band's greatest hits.

The compilation was initially released under Greatest Hits title with a sticker Sight + Sound on the cover. It was later internationally released as Greatest Hits: Sound & Vision in early 2006. The new version omits "X Offender" and "(I'm Always Touched by Your) Presence, Dear" on both the CD and DVD, but adds the music video for "Rapture Riders" on the DVD.

The digital version of the album further omits "Maria" and "Rapture Riders".

Track listing

Production audio disc
 Mike Chapman - producer tracks 1-3, 5, 6 & 13-19
 Giorgio Moroder - producer track 4
 Craig Leon - producer track 7, co-producer track 21
 Super Buddha - remix producer track 8
 Richard Gottehrer - original producer track 8, producer tracks 9-12
 Paolo Cilione - producer track 20
 Claudio Camaione - producer track 20
 Steve Thompson - co-producer track 21
 Mark Vidler - producer track 22 for Go Home productions

References

2005 greatest hits albums
Albums produced by Mike Chapman
Blondie (band) compilation albums
2005 video albums
Music video compilation albums